San Matías (Santa Cruz) is a small town in Bolivia.

References

Populated places in Santa Cruz Department (Bolivia)

de:San Matías (Santa Cruz)